Fort Seneca is a census-designated place in Pleasant Township, Seneca County, Ohio, United States.  It is located on State Route 53, approximately  North of Tiffin.  It had a population of 254 in 2010. Although unincorporated, Fort Seneca had a post office, with the ZIP code of 44829 until 1998.  The post office was opened on December 15, 1821.

Fort Seneca was built nearby in Jul. 1813 by Gen. William Henry Harrison during the War of 1812. The community of Fort Seneca was platted in 1836, and named after Old Fort Seneca, which was located 2 miles away from the present town site.

Demographics

References

Census-designated places in Seneca County, Ohio
Populated places established in 1821